Piotr Bartkowiak (born September 21, 1975 in Poznań) is a Polish football player.

Bartkowiak plays as a midfielder. He started his football trainings in the "Orkan" club from Konarzewo. At 15 he joined the Lech Poznań club. He had to wait four years before playing in the senior game – he debuted on August 13, 1994 in the tied (1:1) game with  Górnik Zabrze in Zabrze. During the autumn of 1994 he played in three more league games and one “Poland Cup” game. During his nominal membership in Lech Poznań, he has been playing as a “loaned player” in the lower ranking clubs of Luboński Klub Sportowy and Warta Śrem.

He spent the season of 1996 and 1997 in the Zawisza Bydgoszcz team. Later he played in Astra Krotoszyn (1997–98), Lubuszanin Drezdenko (spring 1999), again in Astra (autumn 1999), then in Orkan Konarzewo (also autumn 1999). In spring of 2000 he rejoined Lech Poznań (a 2nd league club at the time), but he did not play in the first team. Since autumn 2000 (with a short break to play in Astra Krotoszyn), he was a playing coach of his first club Orkan Konarzewo.

He received professional training for a locksmith–welder.

References

1975 births
Living people
Polish footballers
Lech Poznań players
Zawisza Bydgoszcz players
Footballers from Poznań
Association football midfielders